Hilarographa shehkonga is a species of moth of the family Tortricidae. It is found in Hong Kong, China.

The wingspan is about 10 mm. The ground colour of the forewings is white, consisting of a large submedian dorsal blotch accompanied by a concolorous spot at the middle of the basal blotch. The basal streak is yellowish. The remaining area is rust orange. The hindwings are creamy brown with brown subterminal fascia along the terminal part of the wing.

Etymology
The name refers to the type locality.

References

Moths described in 2009
Hilarographini